In Greek mythology, Atthis or Attis (Ancient Greek: Ἀτθίς or Ἀθθίς) was the eponymous heroine of Attica.

Family 
Atthis was an Athenian princess as the daughter of the autochthonous King Cranaus and Pedias, the Lacedaemonian daughter of Mynes. She was the sister of Cranaë and Cranaechme.

Mythology 
When Attis died a virgin, her father Cranaus named in her honour the land Attica which was formerly called Actaea (Acte or Actica) after King Actaeus, its former ruler.

Other use 
The two birds into which Philomele and her sister Procne were metamorphosed, were likewise called Attis.

Notes

References 

 Pausanias, Description of Greece with an English Translation by W.H.S. Jones, Litt.D., and H.A. Ormerod, M.A., in 4 Volumes. Cambridge, MA, Harvard University Press; London, William Heinemann Ltd. 1918. . Online version at the Perseus Digital Library
 Pausanias, Graeciae Descriptio. 3 vols. Leipzig, Teubner. 1903.  Greek text available at the Perseus Digital Library.

Princesses in Greek mythology

Attican characters in Greek mythology